Renato Sacchi (11 December 1928 – 15 October 2020) was an Italian sports shooter. He competed in the 50 m pistol event at the 1952 Summer Olympics.

References

External links
 

1928 births
2020 deaths
Italian male sport shooters
Olympic shooters of Italy
Shooters at the 1952 Summer Olympics
Place of birth missing